Loxagrotis was a genus of moths of the family Noctuidae, it is now considered a subgenus of Dichagyris.

Species
 Dichagyris acclivis (Morrison, 1875)
 Dichagyris albicosta (Smith, 1888)
 Dichagyris capnota (Smith, 1908)
 Dichagyris grotei Franclemont & Todd, 1983
 Dichagyris kyune (Barnes, 1904)
 Dichagyris neoclivis (Smith, 1888)
 Dichagyris proclivis (Smith, 1888)
 Dichagyris salina (Barnes, 1904)
 Dichagyris socorro (Barnes, 1904)
 Dichagyris timbor (Dyar, 1919)

Former species
 Loxagrotis serano is now Richia serano (Smith, 1910)

References
Natural History Museum Lepidoptera genus database
Loxagrotis at funet

Noctuinae